Lee Ki-hyun (born 13 November 1978) is a South Korean alpine skier. He competed in the men's slalom at the 2002 Winter Olympics.

References

1978 births
Living people
South Korean male alpine skiers
Olympic alpine skiers of South Korea
Alpine skiers at the 2002 Winter Olympics
Place of birth missing (living people)
Asian Games medalists in alpine skiing
Asian Games bronze medalists for South Korea
Alpine skiers at the 1999 Asian Winter Games
Medalists at the 1999 Asian Winter Games
21st-century South Korean people